Khunik (also Romanized as Khūnīk) is a village in Darmian Rural District, in the Central District of Darmian County, South Khorasan Province, Iran. At the 2006 census, its population was 43, in 10 families.

References 

Populated places in Darmian County